Bobby Hume (18 March 1941 – 26 March 1997) was a Scottish professional footballer.

Life and career
Born in Glasgow, his first club was the Scottish junior club Kirkintilloch Rob Roy. Hume signed for Rangers in 1959 and was to make 23 first-team appearances (including 17 League appearances) with them, scoring 3 goals. He made his Rangers début in December 1959 in a home match against Kilmarnock. He was in the Rangers side that faced Fiorentina of Italy in the first leg of the first European Cup-Winners' Cup final in 1961, a final Rangers lost. His Rangers first-team appearances were probably limited by the form of left-winger Davie Wilson.

He was one of the first British footballers to wear contact lenses on the field of play. In 1962 he signed for Middlesbrough where he would make 19 first-team appearances (scoring 5 goals) before returning to Scotland where he signed for Aberdeen (33 appearances and 4 goals in two seasons). He also played 3 times for Alloa Athletic, scoring a single goal.

In 1965 he emigrated to South Africa where he signed for Johannesburg club Highlands Park; his brother Ronnie was a teammate. He helped Highlands Park win their fifth South African league title in seven years in 1966. After retirement he continued to live in Johannesburg with his wife and four children. Hume was shot dead in March 1997 at the wheel of his car near his home, the victim of a carjacking.

References

External links
 "Bobby Hume" - Article from The Herald
 
 Bobby Hume photo - Rangers In This Ibrox Dressing Room Picture - Rangersmedia.com

1941 births
1997 deaths
Footballers from Glasgow
Scottish footballers
Association football wingers
Kirkintilloch Rob Roy F.C. players
Rangers F.C. players
Middlesbrough F.C. players
Aberdeen F.C. players
Alloa Athletic F.C. players
Highlands Park F.C. players
Scottish Football League players
English Football League players
Scottish expatriate footballers
Expatriate soccer players in South Africa
Scottish expatriate sportspeople in South Africa
Scottish Junior Football Association players
Deaths by firearm in South Africa